Sen Son Kon Rak was a Thai romantic-drama TV series that aired on Channel 3, it starred Pongsakorn Mettarikanon,  Kamolned Ruengsri and Pitchapa Phanthumchinda. It's the forth drama of project "My hero".

Plot 
Khong Thamdee (Pongsakorn Mettarikanon) who came from broken family became social worker whose purpose in life is to help others. One of latest case is Miao (Kamolned Ruengsri), a broken one.

Cast

Main cast 

 Pongsakorn Mettarikanon as Khong Thamdee
 Kamolned Ruengsri as Montha Phasuk (Miao)
 Pitchapa Phanthumchinda as Thicha

Supporting cast 

 Saranyoo Prachakrit as Peera
 Sawitree Samipak as Rawi 
 Pornnapra Theptinnakorn as Thapthim
 Pharunyoo Rojanawuttitham as Chai
 Natha Lloyd as Nari Op-ari
 Jaidee Deedeedee as Surarak Tathip
 Sumet Ong-at as Kamchai Trongsucharit
 Somjit Jongjohor as Sawai
 Kosawis Piyasakulkaew as Pae Panyakraikul
 Kluay Chernyim as Sawat
 Noi Phongam as Jaeo
 Korakot Thanaphat as Phrom
 Rungnapha Benjamaporn as Wan
 Chonlamak Tha Chiangthong as Rai
 Saranthon Klaiudom as Ple
 Suppanad Jittaleela as Nang
 Ronnawee Sereerat as Saen
 Natnischa Cerdchoobuphrakaree as Noina
 Nisawan Silpapearsue as Jiaranai Denwai
 Narongsak Angkap as Dam
 Kanthida Chang as Som

Guests 

 Sinjai Plengpanich as Teacher Chanthra
 Pakorn Chatborirak as Major Techat Wasutraphaisan (Ben)
 Warintorn Panhakarn as Teacher Patsakorn Wirayakan (Pat)
 Jaron Sorat as Itsara Ratchaphonkun
 Louis Scott as Akhin Nopprasit
 Duanghathai Sathathip as Nid

References

External links 

 
 Sen Son Kon Rak on Thai TV 3
 Sen Son Kon Rak on Siamzone
 Sen Son Kon Rak's synopsis on online-idol
 Cholumpi Production

Thai romance television series
2010s Thai television series
2018 Thai television series debuts
2018 Thai television series endings
Thai drama television series
Television shows set in Bangkok
Channel 3 (Thailand) original programming